David "Space Beaver" Guillas (born February 27, 1979) is a Canadian guitarist, formerly of Giant Sons Rough Music, and hardcore punk band Propagandhi. He left Propagandhi to pursue a career as a teacher.

Career 

In early April 2002, Guillas played guitar for Giant Sons, a roots rock turned instrumental band in Winnipeg, Manitoba. The band broke up in August 2003, and ex-members of Giant Sons and Standstill formed a new band called Rough Music in February or March 2004.

In August 2006 he became a member of Winnipeg hardcore punk outfit Propagandhi, who are still active on the Winnipeg music scene. Guillas left Propagandhi in 2015 in favor of his teaching career, however it was originally intended that he would still perform on studio recordings. However, his successor - Sulynn Hago - was credited as a full band member on the band's next release Victory Lap and Guillas only provided additional guitar parts credited as a "Propagandhi alumnus".

A 15-track Giant Sons album titled Anthology was released on G7 Welcoming Committee Records in 2006, compiling their two earlier releases.

Guillas now teaches public school in Winnipeg's inner city.

References

External links
Giant Sons' website
Giant Sons' MySpace Page
Rough Music's MySpace Page

Living people
Anarcho-punk musicians
Musicians from Winnipeg
1979 births
Canadian punk rock guitarists
21st-century guitarists